Nesma Airlines is an Egyptian airline (member of Saudi Arabia’s Nesma Group) which operates scheduled international regional flights as well as regional flights within Saudi Arabia. It operates as a full-service carrier on international flights.

History 
Nesma Airlines first commercial flight was on 18 July 2010 from Hurghada to Ljubljana. The airline also operated charter flights linking Egypt, Europe, the Middle East, Saudi Arabia, the United Kingdom and Italy, Spain, Poland and France.

The airline started to operate scheduled flights to Saudi Arabia on the 24 June 2011 to Ha'il, Tabuk and Taif.

On 27 October 2016, the airline launched domestic services within Saudi Arabia, operating out of a central hub at Ha'il Regional Airport to various locations in the Saudi Arabia including Tabuk and Qaisumah using ATR 72-600 aircraft.

On 21 November 2016, Nesma Airlines began new routes  from Jeddah between Riyadh, Dammam and Ha'il using A320 aircraft.

Destinations 

As of July 2022, Nesma Airlines's schedule flights included:
Egypt
 Cairo – Cairo International Airport Base
 Marsa Alam - Marsa Alam International Airport
 Sharm El Sheikh - Sharm El Sheikh International Airport
 Sohag - Sohag International Airport

Saudi Arabia
 Al-Jawf – Al-Jawf Airport
 Jeddah – King Abdulaziz International Airport
 Qassim – Qassim Airport
 Riyadh – King Khaled International Airport
 Tabuk – Tabuk Airport
 Taif – Taif Airport

Fleet 

As of September 2022, the Nesma Airlines Egypt fleet consists of the following aircraft:

Nesma Airlines Egypt current fleet

Nesma Airlines Egypt former fleet
The airline previously operated the following aircraft:
 1 Airbus A319
 1 further Airbus A320

Nesma Airlines Saudi Arabia current fleet 
As of July 2022, Nesma Airlines Saudi Arabia does not operate any of their own aircraft.

Nesma Airlines Saudi Arabia former fleet 
 4 ATR 72-600s
 3 Airbus A320-200s
 2 Airbus A321-200s
 1 Boeing 777-200ER

References

External links 

 
http://www.nesma.com
First Online booking and reservation website for Nesma Airlines

Airlines of Egypt
Airlines of Saudi Arabia
Airlines established in 2010
Charter airlines
Egyptian companies established in 2010
2010 establishments in Saudi Arabia